Anton Obernoster was an Austrian luger who competed in the early 1970s. A natural track luger, he won five medals at the FIL European Luge Natural Track Championships with two golds (Doubles: 1970, Singles: 1971) and three silvers (Singles: 1970; Doubles: 1971, 1973).

References
Natural track European Championships results 1970-2006.

Austrian male lugers
Possibly living people
Year of birth missing